Sir James Macaulay Higginson (1805 – 28 June 1885) was an Anglo-Irish colonial administrator who was Governor of Antigua from 1847 to 1850.

Biography
Higginson was born in County Antrim, Ireland, the son of Major James Higginson and Mary Macaulay.  He was educated at Trinity College, Dublin.

He entered the Bengal Army in 1824. He was secretary to Sir Charles Metcalfe, administrator in British India, and accompanied him when Metcalfe was posted to Jamaica and then Canada. He was the eighth Governor of Mauritius. from 8 January 1851 to 20 September 1857.

He was appointed Companion of the Order of the Bath in 1851 and Knight Commander of the Order in 1857.

Personal life
In 1835 in Calcutta, Higginson married firstly, Louisa Shakespear, the eldest daughter of Henry Davenport Shakespear. Secondly, he married Olivia Nichola Dobbs at Leamington Spa, on 11 November 1854.

He died in Tulfarris, County Wicklow, aged 79.

References

1805 births
1885 deaths
Alumni of Trinity College Dublin
Governors of British Mauritius
Knights Commander of the Order of the Bath
Governors of Antigua and Barbuda
Date of birth missing
People from County Antrim